Cymbidium goeringii, the noble orchid, is an orchid found in temperate locations of East Asia including Japan, China, Taiwan and South Korea. The type specimen was collected in Japan.

References

External links
Cymbidium goeringii

goeringii
Orchids of China
Orchids of Korea
Orchids of Japan